Sebastiania warmingii is a species of flowering plant in the family Euphorbiaceae. It was originally described as Excoecaria warmingii Müll.Arg. in 1874. It is native to Minas Gerais, Brazil.

References

Plants described in 1874
Flora of Brazil
warmingii